The Sword Smith is a low fantasy fiction by American writer Eleanor Arnason, published in 1978 by Condor. The beginning of the story plunged straight into the narration of a smith on the run, named Limper, with a young dragon named Nargri.  Almost all explanations about who they were and why they were on the run was revealed through dialogues between the characters.

Unlike other fantasy novels where there was a definite plot, this novel subtly examines various themes of prejudice, artistic aspirations versus pragmatism, stoic acceptance of life and the right of a man to enjoy simple freedom, without weaving a grand major plot.

Characters
Limper was the smith of King of Eshgorin.  Dissatisfied with the work assigned to him by the king, he quit.  But in his world, quitting is only possible if the king is not able to get his hands on him.  Despite being not a fighter and having a limp, Limper demonstrated wit and a strong instinct for survival necessary in his pursuit to follow his own path.

Nargri is a young dragon companion of Limper.  In this world, adult dragons were the size of adult humans, but were supposedly of more advanced, having built cities when humans were still living in crude mud huts.  By the time of the story, dragons were so rare that many thought them as legends.  It was revealed that dragons were sophisticated creatures and superior craftsmen compared to humans.  But as the human race became dominant, many dragons sought to protect their culture by retreating underground.  Nargri descended from the exceptions who believed dragons should remain above ground, to interact with the changing world, while withdrawal from the world would lead to extinction.

References
 Arnason, Eleanor.  The Sword Smith.  1978 Condor,  New York.

1978 American novels
1978 fantasy novels
American fantasy novels
Debut fantasy novels
Novels by Eleanor Arnason
1978 debut novels